Tiger is the name of several fictional characters in comics.  Characters include:
 Tiger (Image Comics), an Image Comics character who has appeared in Savage Dragon
 Tiger (Wildstorm), a Wildstorm character who has appeared in Gen¹³
 Bronze Tiger, a DC Comics martial artist
 Flying Tiger (disambiguation)#Entertainment, a number of comics characters
 Smiling Tiger, a Marvel Comics supervillain
 Tiger-Man, an Atlas/Seaboard Comics character
 Tiger Shark (Marvel Comics), a Marvel Comics supervillain
 White Tiger (comics), a number of Marvel Comics characters

See also
Tiger (disambiguation)
Tigress (comics)
 Tiger (Fleetway), a British comic
 Tiger (comic strip), an American comic strip

References